Bheki Dlamini served as acting Prime Minister of Swaziland from 18 September 2008 to 23 October 2008.

Biography 
Dlamini was 2006-2013 head of the royal office of King Mswati III. After the dismissal of the previous government of Prime Minister Absalom Themba Dlamini, he was on 18 September 2008 acting Prime Minister of Swaziland. He held this office until October 23, 2008 and was then replaced by Barnabas Sibusiso Dlamini.

References

Year of birth missing (living people)
Living people
Prime Ministers of Eswatini